Jasminium abyssinicum (forest jasmine) is a species of jasmine, in the family Oleaceae.

Jasminum abyssinicum is a strong to slender woody climber in high-altitude montane forests, climbing into the forest canopy which stems that can be robust up to 13 cm in diameter. The leaves are opposite, trifoliolate; leaflets are broadly ovate with a distinct driptip, dark glossy green above, hairless except for pockets of hairs in the axils of the leaves. The flowers are produced at the ends twigs or in axils of leaves. The flowers are white, tinged with pink on the outside, sweetly scented with a corolla with 5 or sometimes 6 elliptic lobes. The fruits are a single- or bi-lobed berry 7 mm long, fleshy, glossy black.

Jasminum abyssinicum  is native to Africa from Ethiopia to KwaZulu-Natal, South Africa. It has been reported from Burundi, Cameroon, Rwanda, Congo-Kinshasa, Eritrea, Ethiopia, Kenya, Uganda, Malawi, Mozambique, Zambia, Zimbabwe, Natal and Transvaal.

The Maasai people of Kenya use this plant as a medicinal remedy for wounds. In sheep, it is traditionally used as a treatment for the parasitic nematode Hemonchus contortus.

Etymology
'Jasminum' is a Latinized form of the Arabic word, 'yasemin' for sweetly scented plants.

Uses
It shows anti-inflammatory and analgesic effects.

References

External links
photo of herbarium specimen at Missouri Botanical Garden, type of Jasminum abyssinicum
Beautiful Flowers, Jasminum abyssinicum
Malvarosa, J. abyssinicum

abyssinicum
Flora of Burundi
Flora of Cameroon
Flora of Rwanda
Flora of Eritrea
Flora of Ethiopia
Flora of Kenya
Flora of Uganda
Flora of Malawi
Flora of Mozambique
Flora of Zambia
Flora of Zimbabwe
Flora of South Africa
Plants described in 1844